The geography of France consists of a terrain that is mostly flat plains or gently rolling hills in the north and west and mountainous in the south (including the Massif Central and the Pyrenees) and the east (the highest points being in the Alps). It is the third largest country in Europe by area (after Russia and Ukraine) and the largest in Western Europe.

Physical geography of Metropolitan France

Climate

The French metropolitan territory is relatively large, so the climate is not uniform, giving rise to the following climate nuances:
The hot-summer mediterranean climate (Csa) is found along the Gulf of Lion. Summers are hot and dry, while winters are mild and wet. Cities affected by this climate: Arles, Avignon, Fréjus, Hyères, Marseille, Menton, Montpellier, Nice, Perpignan, Toulon.
The warm-summer mediterranean climate (Csb) is found in the northern part of Brittany. Summers are warm and dry, while winters are cool and wet. Cities affected by this climate: Belle Île, Saint-Brieuc.
The humid subtropical climate (Cfa) is found in the Garonne and Rhône's inland plains. Summers are hot and wet, while winters are cool and damp. Cities affected by this climate: Albi, Carcassonne, Lyon, Orange, Toulouse, Valence.
The oceanic climate (Cfb) is found around the coasts of the Bay of Biscay, and a little bit inland. Summers are pleasantly warm and wet, while winters are cool and damp. Cities affected by this climate: Amiens, Biarritz, Bordeaux, Brest, Cherbourg-en-Cotentin, Dunkirk, Lille, Nantes, Orléans, Paris, Reims, Tours.
The degraded oceanic climate (degraded-Cfb) is found in the interior plains and in the intra-alpine valleys, far from the ocean (or sea). Summers are hot and wet, while winters are cold and gloomy. Cities affected by this climate: Annecy, Besançon, Bourges, Chambéry, Clermont-Ferrand, Colmar, Dijon, Grenoble, Langres, Metz, Mulhouse, Nancy, Strasbourg.
The subalpine oceanic climate (Cfc) is found at the foot of all the mountainous regions of France. Summers are short, cool and wet, while winters are moderately cold and damp. No major cities are affected by this climate.
The warm-summer mediterranean continental climate (Dsb) is found in all the mountainous regions of Southern France between 700 and 1,400 metres a.s.l. Summers are pleasantly warm and dry, while winters are very cold and snowy. City affected by this climate: Barcelonnette.
The cool-summer mediterranean continental climate (Dsc) is found in all the mountainous regions of Southern France between 1,400 and 2,100 metres a.s.l. Summers are cool, short and dry, while winters are very cold and snowy. Place affected by this climate: Isola 2000.
The warm-summer humid continental climate (Dfb) is found in all the mountainous regions of the Northern half of France between 500 and 1,000 metres a.s.l. Summers are pleasantly warm and wet, while winters are very cold and snowy. Cities affected by this climate: Chamonix, Mouthe. In January 1985, in Mouthe, the temperature has dropped under −41 °C.
The subalpine climate (Dfc) is found in all the mountainous regions of the northern half of France between 1,000 and 2,000 metres a.s.l. Summers are cool, short and wet, while winters are very cold and snowy. Places affected by this climate: Cauterets Courchevel, Alpe d'Huez, Les 2 Alpes, Peyragudes, Val-Thorens.
 The alpine tundra climate (ET) is found in all the mountainous regions of France, generally above 2,000 or 2,500 metres a.s.l. Summers are chilly and wet, while winters are extremely cold, long and snowy. Mountains affected by this climate: Aiguilles-Rouges, Aravis, the top of Crêt de la neige (rare, altitude 1,718 m) and the top of Grand-Ballon (rare, altitude 1,423 m).
 The ice cap climate (EF) is found in all the mountainous regions of France that have a glacier. Summers are cold and wet, while winters are extremely cold, long and snowy. Mountains affected by this climate: Aiguille du midi, Barre des Écrins, Belledonne, Grand-Casse, Mont Blanc (4,810 m), Pic du Midi de Bigorre.

Climate change in France includes above average heating.

Elevation extremes
 Lowest point: Étang de Lavalduc, Bouches-du-Rhône -10 m
 Highest point: Mont Blanc 4,808 m

Land use
 Arable land: 33.40%
 Permanent crops: 1.83%
 Other: 64.77% (2007)

Irrigated land: 26,420 km2 (2007)

Total renewable water resources: 211 km3 (2011)

Freshwater withdrawal (domestic/industrial/agricultural): 31.62 km3/yr (19%/71%/10%) (512.1 m3/yr per capita) (2009)

Natural resources
Coal, iron ore, bauxite, zinc, uranium, antimony, arsenic, potash, feldspar, fluorspar, gypsum, timber, fish, gold, clay, petroleum

Natural hazards
Flooding, avalanches, midwinter windstorms, drought, forest fires in the south near the Mediterranean

Environment
The region that now comprises France consisted of open grassland during the Pleistocene Ice Age. France gradually became forested as the glaciers retreated starting in 10,000 BC, but clearing of these primeval forests began in Neolithic times. These forests were still fairly extensive until the medieval era.

In prehistoric times, France was home to large predatory animals such as wolves and brown bears, as well as herbivores such as elk. The larger fauna have disappeared outside the Pyrenees Mountains where bears live as a protected species. Smaller animals include martens, wild pigs, foxes, weasels, bats, rodents, rabbits, and assorted birds.

By the 15th century, France had largely been denuded of its forests and was forced to rely on Scandinavia and their North American colonies for lumber. Significant remaining forested areas are in the Gascony region and north in the Alsace-Ardennes area. The Ardennes Forest was the scene of extensive fighting in both world wars.

The north central part of this region is dominated by the Paris Basin, which consists of a layered sequence of sedimentary rocks. Fertile soils over much of the area make good agricultural land. The Normandy coast to the northwest is characterized by high, chalk cliffs, while the Brittany coast (the peninsula to the west) is highly indented where deep valleys were drowned by the sea, and the Biscay coast to the southwest is marked by flat, sandy beaches.

A recent global remote sensing analysis suggested that there were 1,433 km² of tidal flats in France, making it the 23rd ranked country in terms of tidal flat area.

Political geography

Internal divisions

France has several levels of internal divisions. The first-level administrative division of Integral France is regions. Besides this the French Republic has sovereignty over several other territories, with various administrative levels. 
Metropolitan (i.e. European) France is divided into 12 régions and 1 territorial collectivity, Corsica. However, Corsica is referred to as a region in common speech. These regions are subdivided into 96 départements, which are further divided into 320 arrondissements, which are further divided into 1,995 cantons, which are further divided into 34,836 communes (as of 1/1/2021).
Five overseas regions (régions d'outre-mer, or ROM): Guadeloupe, French Guiana, Martinique, Mayotte, and Réunion, with identical status to metropolitan regions. This double structure (région/) is new, due to the recent extension of the regional scheme to the overseas départements, and may soon transform into a single structure, with the merger of the regional and departmental assemblies. Another proposed change is that new départements are created such as in the case of Réunion, where it has been proposed to create a second  in the south of the island, with the région of Réunion above these two départements.
Four overseas collectivities (collectivités d'outre-mer, or COM): Saint-Pierre and Miquelon, Saint Barthélemy, Saint Martin, and Wallis and Futuna. 
One overseas "country" (pays d'outre-mer, or POM): French Polynesia. In 2003 it became an overseas collectivity (or COM). Its statutory law of 27 February 2004 gives it the particular designation of overseas country inside the Republic (or POM), but without legal modification of its status.
One sui generis collectivity (collectivité sui generis): New Caledonia, whose status is unique in the French Republic.
One overseas territory (territoire d'outre-mer, or TOM): the French Southern and Antarctic Lands divided into 5 districts: Kerguelen Islands, Crozet Islands, Île Amsterdam and Île Saint-Paul, Adélie Land, and the Scattered islands (Banc du Geyser, Bassas da India, Europa, Juan de Nova, Glorioso, and Tromelin).
One uninhabited island in the Pacific Ocean off the coast of Mexico which belongs directly to the central State public land and is administered by the high-commissioner of the French Republic in French Polynesia: Clipperton.

Boundaries
 Land boundaries:
 Total: 
  (metropolitan),  (French Guiana)  (Saint Martin)
 Border countries:
 Andorra , Belgium , Germany , Italy , Luxembourg , Monaco , Spain , Switzerland  (metropolitan)
 Brazil , Suriname ,  (French Guiana) 
 Sint Maarten  (Saint Martin)
 Coastline:  (metropolitan),  (French Guiana),  (Guadeloupe),  (Martinique),  (Réunion)
 Maritime claims:
 Territorial sea: 
 Contiguous zone: 
 Exclusive economic zone:  only in Europe.  including all overseas territories. The  does not apply to the Mediterranean Sea
 Continental shelf:  depth or to the depth of exploitation

Extreme points

This is a list of the extreme points of France; the points that are farther north, south, east or west than any other location.

France (mainland Europe) 
 Northernmost point — Bray-Dunes, Nord at 
 Southernmost point — Puig de Comanegra, Lamanère, Pyrénées-Orientales at 
 Westernmost point — Pointe de Corsen, Plouarzel, Finistère at 
 Easternmost point — Lauterbourg, Bas Rhin at

France (metropolitan) 
 Northernmost point — Bray-Dunes, Nord at 
 Southernmost point — Îles Lavezzi (off Corsica), Bonifacio, Corse-du-Sud at 
 Westernmost point — Isle of Ushant (off Brittany), Finistère at 
 Easternmost point — San-Giuliano (near Cervione), Haute-Corse at

France (including départements d'outre mer) 

 Northernmost point — Bray-Dunes, Nord at 
 Westernmost point — Pointe-Noire, Guadeloupe at 
 Easternmost point — Sainte-Rose, Réunion at

France (all territory of the French Republic) 

 Northernmost point : Bray-Dunes, Nord at 
 Southernmost point : îles de Boynes, Kerguelen Islands, French Southern and Antarctic Lands at 
 Westernmost point : Toloke, Futuna, Wallis and Futuna at 
 Easternmost point : Hunter Island, New Caledonia at

Temperature extremes
These are the extreme temperatures in France.

See also
 Regions of France
 List of fifteen largest French metropolitan areas by population
 Géoportail
 Institut géographique national

Lists:
 List of islands of France
 List of lakes in France
 List of national parks of France
 Rivers of France

General:
 Geography of Europe

References

External links

  GéoPortail - Geography portal of France, high altitude imagery, maps ...
 A detailed map of France showing all régions and numbered départements, including their préfectures.